Joel Raymond Voelkert (born November 25, 1948) is an American former handball player who competed in the 1972 Summer Olympics. He was born in Elkhart, Indiana.

In 1972 he was part of the American team which finished 14th in the Olympic tournament. He played all five matches and scored seven goals.

References

External links
 Profile at sports-reference.com

1948 births
Living people
American male handball players
Olympic handball players of the United States
Handball players at the 1972 Summer Olympics